Remetské Hámre is a village and municipality in the Sobrance District in the Košice Region of east Slovakia.

History
In historical records the village was first mentioned in 1828 making it the newest village in Sobrance district.

Geography
The village lies at an altitude of 286 metres and covers an area of 24.586 km².
It has a population of about 665 people.

Facilities
The village has a public library, a swimming pool and a football pitch.

References

External links
 
http://www.statistics.sk/mosmis/eng/run.html
http://en.e-obce.sk/obec/remetskehamre/remetske-hamre.html
https://web.archive.org/web/20131101170226/http://www.remetskehamre.sk/

Villages and municipalities in Sobrance District